David Hobart may refer to:
 David Hobart (bobsleigh)
 David Hobart (RAF officer)